Loni is a somewhat popular female name related to the given names Leonie, Lonna (or Lona) and Lonnie.

It may refer to:

People
 Loni (Pashtun tribe), a branch of the Durrani tribe in Pakistan and Afghanistan
 Arman Loni (1983-2019), Pashtun human rights activist
 Wranga Loni, Pashtun human rights activist (sister of Arman Loni)
 Loni Ackerman (born 1949), American Broadway musical theatre performer and cabaret singer
 Loni Anderson (born 1945), American actress
 Loni Hancock (born 1940), California state senator
 Loni Harwood, American poker player
 Loni Heuser (1908-1999), German film actress
 Loni Love (born 1971), American actress and comedian
 Eleanore Loni Nest (1915–1990), German actress
 Loni Rose (born 1976/77), American singer-songwriter
 Loni Sanders (born 1958), retired porn star and adult model

Fictional characters
 Lóni, a Dwarf in J. R. R. Tolkien's Middle-earth fictional universe
 Loni Garvey, in the Mobile Suit Gundam Unicorn novel series

Feminine given names